The Winnipeg general strike of 1919 was one of the most famous and influential strikes in Canadian history. For six weeks, May 15 to June 26, more than 30,000 strikers brought economic activity to a standstill in Winnipeg, Manitoba, which at the time was Canada's third largest city. In the short term, the strike ended in arrests, bloodshed, and defeat, but in the long run it contributed to the development of a stronger labour movement and the tradition of social democratic politics in Canada.

Causes of the    strike 

There were many background causes for the strike, most of them related to the prevailing social inequalities and the impoverished condition of the city's working class. Wages were low, prices were rising, employment was unstable, immigrants faced discrimination, housing and health conditions were poor. In addition, there was resentment of the enormous profits enjoyed by employers during the war. Soldiers returning from the war were determined to see improved social conditions and opportunities after their harrowing experiences overseas. Most workers did not have union representation, but many were influenced by the hope of achieving greater economic security through unions. 

Many workers were also influenced by socialist ideas voiced by local reformers, radicals and revolutionaries. These attracted greater interest, especially among the large population of immigrants from Eastern Europe, after the Russian Revolution of 1917. A meeting of western labour delegates in Calgary in March 1919 adopted numerous radical resolutions, including support for a five-day week and a six-hour day. They also called for the establishment of a new union centre, the One Big Union, to promote class solidarity by uniting workers from all trades and industries in one organization. The idea that the OBU instigated the general strike is misleading, as the OBU was not formed until June 1919. However, the "one big union" idea contributed to the atmosphere of unrest. Similar volatile conditions existed elsewhere in Canada, and in other countries around the world, at the end of World War I, but the combination of circumstances in Winnipeg proved to be explosive.

The most immediate cause of the strike involved support for collective bargaining in the metal trades and building trades, where workers were attempting to negotiate contracts through their trades councils. When the Metal Trades Council and the Building Trades Council had both failed to secure contracts with employers by the end of April, they went on strike, the building trades on May 1 and the metal trades on May 2. Shortly afterwards, the situation was discussed at meetings of the Winnipeg Trades and Labour Council, the umbrella body for the city's unions. The Labour Council decided to call on their 12,000 affiliated members to vote on a proposal for a general strike. On a smaller scale, this tactic had achieved success for striking city workers a year earlier in 1918. Preliminary results of the vote among the Labour Council's member unions were announced on May 13. The outcome showed overwhelming support for a general strike, 8,667 to 645. Ernest Robinson, secretary of the Labour Council, issued a statement that "every organization but one has voted in favour of the general strike" and that "all public utilities will be tied-up in order to enforce the principle of collective bargaining". A Strike Committee was established, with delegates elected by the city's unions. The leadership included both moderate trade unionists, such as James Winning, a bricklayer who was president of the Trades and Labour Council, and socialists such as R.B. Russell, a machinist who favoured the OBU.

1919 general strike

Organization
At 11:00 a.m. on Thursday May 15, 1919, virtually the entire working population of Winnipeg went on strike. Somewhere around 30,000 workers in the public and private sectors walked off their jobs, and the city experienced a sudden cessation of many normal activities. The Strike Committee requested the police force, who had voted in favour of the strike, to remain on duty. Workers at the city waterworks also remained on the job to provide service at reduced pressure. Union membership had increased substantially during the spring of 1919, but most of the people who came out in support of the general strike were not union members. For instance, the first to leave work, at 7:00 a.m., were the telephone operators, the so-called "hello girls" at the city telephone exchanges, who were not at this time union members. Also on the first day of the strike, the major organizations of returned soldiers announced their support and were active throughout the six weeks of the strike.

In the early days of the strike, one historian has written, "The atmosphere was almost festive, the belief in ultimate victory strong." Participants assembled in city parks to listen to speakers report on the progress of the strike and discuss the many related social reform issues of the time. To ensure that strikers were kept informed of developments, the Strike Committee also published a daily Strike Bulletin. This newspaper urged the strikers to remain peaceable as well as idle: "The only thing the workers have to do to win this strike is to do nothing. Just eat, sleep, play, love, laugh, and look at the sun... Our fight consists of doing no fighting."

Women leaders played an important part in building solidarity among the strikers. Experienced organizers such as Helen "Ma" Armstrong, one of two women on the Strike Committee, encouraged young working women to join the strike and often spoke on street corners and at public meetings. The Women's Labour League raised money to help women workers pay rent. They also set up a kitchen where hundreds of meals were served every day. On June 12 a "ladies day" was held at Victoria Park, where women occupied seats of honour to cheer a speech by J.S. Woodsworth promoting the emancipation of women and the equality of the sexes. An emerging working-class activist named Edith Hancox, who became a notable defender of the city’s dispossessed during the 1920s, is the only woman reported as a speaker at the huge outdoor gatherings at Victoria Park. 

Negotiations between members of the Strike Committee, city council and local businesses produced an arrangement to continue milk and bread deliveries. To make it clear that the delivery men were not strikebreakers, a small poster was printed for display on their wagons reading “PERMITTED BY AUTHORITY OF STRIKE COMMITTEE.” Although the cards were suggested by management, they were also attacked as evidence that the Strike Committee was taking control of the city.

Opposition

In a city divided on class lines, opposition to the strike was led by a group of local businessmen and professionals who described themselves as the Citizens’ Committee of One Thousand. From their headquarters in the Board of Trade building, they encouraged employers not to give in to the strikers and attempted to stir up resentment of “alien” immigrants, who, they charged, were the principal leaders of the strike. They also put pressure on governments to take action against the strike. They published a newspaper, The Winnipeg Citizen, that claimed that "the so-called general strike is in reality revolution – or a daring attempt to overthrow the present industrial and governmental system."

At the end of the first week of the strike, two federal cabinet ministers arrived in Winnipeg to assess the situation, the acting Minister of Justice Arthur Meighen and the Minister of Labour Gideon Robertson. They refused to meet with the Strike Committee, but consulted with the Citizens’ Committee, who greatly influenced their conclusions. Meighen issued a statement that the strike was "a cloak for something far deeper—an effort to 'overturn' the proper authority". Robertson reported back to Ottawa that “the motive behind this strike undoubtedly was the overthrow of Constitutional Government.” They warned striking postal workers, who were federal employees, to return to work or lose their jobs.  At this time, they also authorized the local government to use the armed forces and the Royal Northwest Mounted Police as needed. In preparation for arrests, at the beginning of June, and on the advice of one of the leaders of the Citizens' Committee, A.J. Andrews, the federal government  amended the Immigration Act to allow for the deportation without trial of any British citizens not born in Canada who were charged with seditious activity.

The municipal government also took action. As large numbers of veterans were holding marches in the streets in support of the strike, on June 5 Mayor Charles F. Gray announced a ban on public demonstrations. On June 9 the city also dismissed almost the entire police force for refusing to sign a pledge promising to neither belong to a union nor participate in a sympathetic strike. With the assistance of the Citizens’ Committee, the city police were replaced with a large body of untrained but better paid special constables who patrolled the streets with clubs. Within hours, one of the special constables, a much-medalled World War I veteran Frederick Coppins, charged into a gathering of strikers and was dragged off his horse and severely pummelled. This led to claims that he was attacked by "enemy ruffians."

The local newspapers, the Winnipeg Free Press and Winnipeg Tribune, had lost the majority of their employees due to the strike, but once they were able to resume publication, they took a decidedly anti-strike stance. The Winnipeg Free Press called the strikers "bohunks," "aliens," and "anarchists" and ran cartoons depicting radicals throwing bombs. These anti-strike views  influenced the opinions of some Winnipeg residents and contributed to the deepening atmosphere of crisis.

A plan to offer a modified form of collective bargaining to the Metal Trades Council was in the works at the middle of the month, but any efforts at compromise were ended by a series of arrests on charges of seditious conspiracy. In the early morning hours of June 17, the RNWMP apprehended several prominent leaders of the strike, including George Armstrong, Roger Bray, Abraham Heaps, William Ivens, R.B. Russell and John Queen. In addition, William Arthur Pritchard, a Vancouver union organizer who was returning from Winnipeg, was arrested in Calgary. R. J. Johns, of Winnipeg, was in Montreal and not arrested at this time. With the exception of Armstrong, who was Canadian-born, they were all British immigrants. Several foreign-born socialists, including Sam Blumenberg, Max Charitonoff and Solomon Almazoff were also arrested, as was Oscar Schoppelrei, an American-born Canadian war veteran of German ethnic origin.

Bloody Saturday

The climax of the strike came a few days later, on Saturday, June 21, which was soon known as Bloody Saturday. To protest against the arrest of the strike leaders, the returned soldiers had announced a demonstration in the form of a “silent parade” on Main Street for Saturday afternoon. Crowds assembled in the thousands in the streets around City Hall. When the soldiers refused to call off the demonstration, Mayor Gray requested assistance from the RNWMP, who entered into the crowds on horseback, wielding clubs in an attempt to disperse the assembly. A streetcar operated by a strikebreaker attempted to travel south on Main Street towards Portage Avenue but was stopped and tipped off the tracks and briefly set on fire.

After the Mayor read the Riot Act, the Mounties entered the fray again, this time discharging their .45 revolvers in three separate volleys. About 120 shots were fired. One man, Mike Sokolowski, was killed on the spot. Another, Steve Szczerbanowicz, died later from his wounds. Hospitals reported about 30 casualties, mainly from police gunfire. Others were tended to by friends and family. As the crowds were chased into sidestreets and broken up, some 80 people were arrested by the “specials” and military patrols that took over the downtown area.

When the Strike Bulletin published its account of the events of Bloody Saturday, the editors, J.S. Woodsworth and Fred J. Dixon, were arrested and charged with seditious libel. They had published articles with headings such as “Kaiserism in Canada” and “The British Way.” The charges against Woodsworth included his quotation of a verse from Isaiah: "Woe unto them that decree unrighteous decrees." Further publication of the newspaper was suppressed.

These events broke the confidence of the Strike Committee, and on June 25, they announced the end of the strike for 11:00 a.m. the next day. After six weeks, workers drifted back to their jobs, but many were blacklisted or otherwise punished for participating in the strike.

Role in the labour revolt
In May and June 1919, general strikes broke out in as many as thirty other cities, from Amherst, Nova Scotia, to Victoria, British Columbia. Some of these strikes were protests against local conditions, some were in solidarity with Winnipeg, and others involved both causes.

Aftermath

"State trials" and deportations
Eight of the strike leaders were brought to trial on charges of seditious conspiracy. The evidence against them focused less on their actions than on their socialist ideas, which were seen as the root cause of the unrest that led to the general strike. Under arrangements accepted (and paid for) by the federal government, the prosecution was conducted by Andrews and other “legal gentlemen” who were active in the Citizens’ Committee during the strike.

Seven of the accused (Armstrong, Bray, Ivens, Johns, Pritchard, Russell and Queen) were found guilty by the largely rural juries selected for the trials. Most were sentenced to one-year sentences, but Russell was sentenced to two years and Bray, who was convicted on a lesser charge, was sentenced to six months. (As well, John Farnell, who had filled the void left in the leadership of pro-strike returned soldiers after Bray's arrest, was sentenced to nine months in prison. He was released three months early, due to his wife's illness.)

Heaps conducted his own defence. He was acquitted on all charges. Dixon, who was charged with seditious libel, delivered a strong defence of the right to free speech as an essential element of the British tradition. After forty hours of deliberation, the largely urban jury acquitted him. This result caused the prosecution to abandon the similar charges against Woodsworth. 

In the case of the “foreigners” arrested on June 17, there were no criminal proceedings. The attempt to deport Almazoff failed, and Charitonoff appealed successfully against a deportation order. Blumenberg and Schoppelrei were deported on technical grounds related to their original entry into the country. Blumenberg found his feet in the U.S., organizing workers in the Duluth area and even running for municipal office there on the socialist platform.

Political impact
A provincial royal commission headed by H.A. Robson investigated the strike. The report deplored sympathetic strikes but concluded that the Winnipeg strike was not a criminal conspiracy by foreigners and stated that "if Capital does not provide enough to assure Labour a contented existence... then the Government might find it necessary to step in and let the state do these things at the expense of Capital."

The impact of the strike was evident in subsequent elections. Labour had elected some representatives prior to the strike but the number significantly increased afterwards at all three levels of government.

While awaiting trial, Queen was re-elected to the Winnipeg City council. While serving out their sentences in prison, Armstrong, Ivens and Queen were elected to the Manitoba legislature. Queen later served seven terms as mayor of Winnipeg. 

Woodsworth was elected as a Labour Member of Parliament from Winnipeg in 1921 and was repeatedly re-elected until his death in 1942. In 1932 he helped found and became leader of the Co-operative Commonwealth Federation, a forerunner of the New Democratic Party. That party was elected to provincial government in Saskatchewan in 1944 and in Manitoba in 1969. Heaps was elected as the Labour Member of Parliament for Winnipeg North in 1925 and re-elected until 1940.

Strike's impact on unions
Organized labour built on the legacy of the strike to strengthen the union movement and to pursue formal collective bargaining rights. The One Big Union flourished briefly, achieving its greatest popularity in 1920. This was followed by the rise of new industrial unions in the 1930s. The renewed poverty and insecurity of the Great Depression led to a long period of labour militancy across Canada in the 1940s, when union membership increased substantially. By the end of that decade, a formal industrial relations regime was established in Canadian law that provided some security for unions and their members but also threatened to limit the scope of their activity.

Historiography
Discussions of the Winnipeg general strike often start from the contemporary debate about whether it was a conspiracy to overthrow the government or a fight for union recognition and a living wage. Given the scale of the general strike and its political impact, it was difficult to consider it only an ordinary collective bargaining dispute. This led some historians to study local labour relations in detail, while others examined the nature of labour reform and radical activism in western Canada. Churches, immigrants, women, soldiers, and municipal politics have also been the subject of study. The “red scare” promoted by business and government spokesmen attracted attention, as did the legal manoeuvres that led to the arrest and conviction of prominent strike supporters on charges of sedition.

While some historians regarded the strike as a western labour revolt rooted in unique conditions in western Canada, others have pointed to widespread labour unrest across Canada, both in 1919 itself  and also during the years from 1917 to 1925. Recent accounts of the strike have also noted that most strikers were not union members, suggesting that the events might be described as an urban rebellion against the failings of the capitalist social order as it existed at the end of World War I.

Commemorations in popular culture

Shortly after the strike, two novels, Ralph Connor’s To Him that Hath (Toronto, 1921) and Douglas Durkin's The Magpie (Toronto, 1923), explored some of the labour and social themes raised by the strike. Fox, a 1991 novel by author Margaret Sweatman, is a work of historical fiction about the events leading up to and following the strike. In 2019, Fernwood Publishing released Papergirl, a young adult novel by Melinda McCracken about a girl who distributes the strikers' newspaper. In the same year, 1919 A Graphic History of the Winnipeg General Strike was published by the Graphic History Collective. 

Among remembrances of this event in Canadian popular culture is the song "In Winnipeg" by musician Mike Ford, included in the album Canada Needs You Volume Two.  In 2005, Danny Schur created a musical called Strike! based on the event.  A film version called Stand! was scheduled for release in 2019 and premiered on September 10, 2019. Many of the famous photographs of the strike were by Winnipeg photographer L. B. Foote. In Winnipeg, there are several memorials and monuments commemorating the strike.

See also

 1918 Vancouver general strike
 1919 Seattle General Strike
 1935 On-to-Ottawa Trek

References

Notes

Bibliography

Further reading
 Balawyder, Aloysius, ed. The Winnipeg General Strike (Copp-Clark Publishing, 1967)
 Bercuson, David. Confrontation at Winnipeg: labour, industrial relations, and the general strike (McGill-Queen's Press-MQUP, 1990)
Bumsted, J.M. The Winnipeg General Strike of 1919: An Illustrated History  (Winnipeg: Watson & Dyer, 1994)
 
Epp-Koop, Stephan. We're Going to Run this City: Winnipeg's Political Left after the General Strike (University of Manitoba Press, 2015)
 Friesen, Gerald. "'Yours In Revolt': The Socialist Party of Canada and the Western Canadian Labour Movement." Labour/Le Travail  (1976) 1 pp. 139–157. online
Graphic History Collective and David Lester, 1919: A Graphic History of the Winnipeg General Strike (Between the Lines, 2019)
 Heron, Craig, ed., The Workers' Revolt in Canada, 1917–1925 (University of Toronto Press, 1998)
Kealey, Gregory S. "1919: The Canadian Labour Revolt," Labour / Le Travail, 13 (Spring 1984), pp. 11–44
Kelly, Paula,  "Looking for Mrs. Armstrong," Canada's History, vol. 82, no. 3 (June–July 2002), pp. 20–26. 
Kramer, Reinhold, and Tom Mitchell. When the State Trembled: How A. J. Andrews and the Citizens' Committee Broke the Winnipeg General Strike (U of Toronto Press, 2010)
 Masters, Donald Campbell. The Winnipeg General Strike (University of Toronto Press, 1950)
McNaught, Kenneth and David J. Bercuson, The Winnipeg Strike: 1919 (Longman Canada, 1974)
 Korneski, Kurt. "Prairie Fire: The Winnipeg General Strike," Labour / Le Travail, 45 (Spring 2000), pp. 259–266. In JSTOR
Penner, Norman, ed. Winnipeg 1919: The Strikers' Own History of the Winnipeg General Strike  (James Lorimer and Company, 1973)
 Stace, Trevor. "Remembering and Forgetting Winnipeg: Making History on the Strike of 1919." Constellations (2014) 5#1 on the historiography of 1919; online.
 Winnipeg General Strike collection at the University of Calgary Archives and Special Collections
 Wiseman, Nelson. Social Democracy in Manitoba: a History of the CCF-NDP (U. of Manitoba Press, 1983)

 
1919 in Canada
1919 labor disputes and strikes
1919 riots
Events in Winnipeg
General strikes
History of Winnipeg
Labour disputes in Manitoba
Riots and civil disorder in Canada
1919 in Manitoba
May 1919 events
June 1919 events
Events of National Historic Significance (Canada)
Articles containing video clips
Strike paper